John Chesser may refer to:
 John Chesser (architect), Scottish architect
 John Chesser (Canadian politician), member of the Legislative Assembly of Upper Canada
 John William Chesser, Scottish solicitor and politician